Castellanza is a town and comune located in the province of Varese, along the boundary of the province of Milan, in the Lombardy region of northern Italy.

Overview
The toponym refers to the castellanze (plural form, singular castellanza), defensive territorial unities who rose around castles and other strong points in the then county of Seprio. The Olona river divides Castellanza in the two main boroughs of Castellanza proper and Castegnate. 
The town is renowned for its recently established private University Carlo Cattaneo (also known as LIUC).
The main church of the city is the Church of San Giulio, Castellanza which is located in Paolo VI Square.

The town has a population of approximately 15,000 inhabitants, more precisely 14,516 in 2019, and since the late nineteenth century has been one of the main industrial centres in the province of Varese. With the beautiful backdrop of the Alps and the famous Italian lakes Lago Maggiore and Lago di Como, the province of Varese is also home to 23,000 manufacturing and craft industries that export over 30% of their products worldwide and generate employment to approximately 175,000 people.

Castellanza received the honorary title of city with a presidential decree on January 4, 1974.

The coat of arms of the municipality represents the union of the two nuclei that formed the city. On the left is a tower, which symbolizes the Castle (Castellanza); on the right a chestnut tree which symbolizes Castegnate. At the time of the attribution of the title of City (1974), the turreted crown, the symbol of the city, was added to the coat of arms surmounted by the crown of the Municipality. The two-crowned coat of arms was later replaced by the one-crowned one.

Sport 
The local football club 'Castellanzese' was founded in 1921. The colours of the team are green and black, which are also used by Venice football club. The venue for internal competitions is the municipal stadium Giovanni Provasi, established in the 1930s.

References

Cities and towns in Lombardy